Vincent FitzGerald & Company is a New York-based publisher of handmade, limited edition artist books, individual prints, and portfolios. The firm was founded in 1980 by Vincent FitzGerald and has collaborated with over 150 artists, artisans, poets, and playwrights.

Vincent FitzGerald & Company has produced a large collection of books represented in many collections throughout the United States and Europe. The bulk of the collection is represented at Columbia University, Iowa University, The Library of Congress, Lyrik-Kabinett in Munich, Montana Museum of Arts and Culture at the University of Montana and the Cary Collection at Rochester Institute of Technology.

Exhibitions 
Vincent FitzGerald & Company has fostered a long relationship with Dieu Donné, a major papermaking mill in Brooklyn, NY. There have been several exhibitions organized by Dieu Donné of the collection of the firm's output, as well as panels on the art of bookmaking.

In 1985, a major exhibition and panel was held around The Côte d'Azur Triangle at the Harcus Gallery in Boston. The book was of the play The Côte d'Azur Triangle by Henry Kondoleon with lithographs and etchings by Mark Beard. The prints were made at Robert Blackburn's Printmaking Workshop, where many of Vincent FitzGerald & Company's artistic connections were made. The Harcus Gallery exhibited the book along with the binding and printing tools used to produce the book. David Becker from the Museum of Fine Arts, Boston moderated a panel to open the exhibition.

In 2000, an exhibition of Vincent FitzGerald & Co.'s collection was held at Columbia University, titled Themes and Variations: The Publications of Vincent FitzGerald & Company. The firm had produced 38 books at the time of the exhibition.

In 2021 a selection of books and prints published by Vincent FitzGerald & Company were on display at JDJ The Ice House in Garrison, NY, included in an exhibition of the work of Susan Weil, a longtime collaborator of FitzGerald's.

Collaborators 
Vincent FitzGerald's practice relates to the French tradition of livres d'artistes, and the collaborative working environment of bringing together multiple people of specific talents to work on a single project. Works by writers such as Henrik Ibsen, James Joyce, Franz Kafka, and Gertrude Stein have been interpreted by artists, printmakers, and other craftsmen to create books and portfolios. FitzGerald has worked closely with translator and bookbinder Zahra Partovi on the selection and translation of texts by 13th century Persian poet Jalāl ad-Dīn Mohammad Rūmī. In 1996, the company published Divan-e shams, which has been described as the firm's masterpiece. Translated for the first time in English by Partovi, the book presents the work of fifteen visual artists in response to a selection of poems from Rumi's Divan-e shams.

Participants

The visual artists that have interpreted text through various media include:

Mark Beard
Joan Busing
Lena Cronqvist
Sandy Gellis
Elizabeth Harrington
Bernard Kirschenbaum
Ted Kurahara
Agnes Murray
James Narres
Dorothea Rockburne
Betye Saar
Annette Senneby
Michelle Stuart
Peter Thompson
Judith Turner
Susan Weil
Neil Welliver
Marjorie Van Dyke
Joan Vennum

The craftsmen include:

Kelly Driscoll
Aleksander Duravcevic
Jerry Kelly, calligrapher
Priscilla Spitler, from Hands On Bookbinding
Paul Wong, paper artist from Dieu Donné

The authors, translators, and playwrights include:

Lee Breuer
Michael Feingold
David Mamet
David Rattray
Zahra Partovi, translator (also bookbinder)

References 

Book publishing companies based in New York City